Vostochny District is the name of several administrative and municipal districts in Russia. The name literally means "eastern".

Districts of the federal subjects

Vostochny District, Moscow, a district in Eastern Administrative Okrug of Moscow

City divisions
Vostochny Okrug, Belgorod, an okrug of the city of Belgorod, the administrative center of Belgorod Oblast
Vostochny City District, Novorossiysk, a city district of Novorossiysk, a city in Krasnodar Krai
Vostochny Administrative Okrug, Tyumen, an administrative okrug of the city of Tyumen, the administrative center of Tyumen Oblast

Historical city divisions
Vostochny City District, Biysk, a city district of Biysk, a city in Altai Krai; existed in 1975–1998

See also
Vostochny (disambiguation)
Vostochny Okrug (disambiguation)
Eastern (disambiguation)

References